Morar may refer to:

 Morar, a village on the west coast of Scotland
 Loch Morar
 Morar railway station
 Morar, now part of Gwalior,  India, a former town and British military cantonment
 Morar Cantonment
 Morar, Nova Scotia
 Moraro, or Morar in Slovene, a commune of Italy
 Morar (surname)

See also 
 Moraru (disambiguation)
 Moara (disambiguation)